The British Columbia Federation of Labour (BCFED), often shortened to the BC Federation of Labour,  is a central organization for organized labour in British Columbia, Canada. It was founded in 1910 and claims to have a membership of 500,000, with 1,200 local and union sections. The BCFED is the provincial affiliate of the Canadian Labour Congress and the umbrella organization for organized labour in British Columbia.

References

External links 
 
 British Columbia Federation of Labour (I)– Web Archive created by the University of Toronto Libraries
 British Columbia Federation of Labour (II)– Web Archive created by the University of Toronto Libraries

Canadian Labour Congress
Provincial federations of labour (Canada)
Trade unions established in 1910